The Culloden Viaduct is a railway viaduct on the Highland Main Line, to the east of the city of Inverness, in the Highland council area of Scotland.

It was designed by Murdoch Paterson and opened in 1898 as part of the Inverness and Aviemore Direct Railway, which was built by the Highland Railway. The 29 span viaduct crosses the wide valley of the River Nairn. At 1800 ft (549 m) in length, it is the longest masonry viaduct in Scotland.

Historic Scotland added the viaduct to its "Category A listed building" protected status on October 5, 1971. It is nearby two important sites: Culloden battlefield and the Clava cairn, a trio of Bronze Age burial cairns.

Culloden Moor railway station was situated at the northern end of the viaduct, but the station was closed in the 1960s. The viaduct remains in use as of 2022.

Terminology
It is known also as the Nairn Viaduct, the Culloden Moor Viaduct or the Clava Viaduct.

See also
Clava cairns of Aviemore

References

Bridges completed in 1898
Railway bridges in Scotland
Category A listed buildings in Highland (council area)
Bridges in Highland (council area)
Listed bridges in Scotland
Viaducts in Scotland
1898 establishments in Scotland